William Loucks may refer to:
 William John Loucks, member of the House of Commons of Canada
 William H. Loucks, member of the South Dakota House of Representatives